Antoine Cyr (born 18 September 1998) is a Canadian cross-country skier. Cyr started skiing at a young age, as both of his parents were also cross-country skiers.

Career
At the FIS Nordic World Ski Championships 2021, Cyr, along with partner Graham Ritchie, placed in seventh place during the team sprint event. They were the youngest team in the final. At the start of the 2021–22 FIS Cross-Country World Cup, Cyr had two top 15 finishes, finishing in 11th and 12th during races of the first World Cup stop.

In January 2022, Cyr won the sprint race as part of the Canadian Championships, which confirmed his automatic qualification to Canada's 2022 Olympic team. On January 13, 2022, Cyr was officially named to Canada's 2022 Olympic team.

Cross-country skiing results
All results are sourced from the International Ski Federation (FIS).

Olympic Games

World Championships

World Cup

Season standings

References

External links
 

1998 births
Living people
Canadian male cross-country skiers
Sportspeople from Gatineau
Cross-country skiers at the 2022 Winter Olympics
Olympic cross-country skiers of Canada